Shart may refer to:

Shart (1954 film), a Bollywood film starring Shashikala
Shart (1969 film), a Bollywood film starring Sanjay Khan
Shart (1986 film), a Bollywood film starring Shabana Azmi
Shart: The Challenge, a 2004 Bollywood film starring Tusshar Kapoor
"Shart", a song by Sonu Nigam from the Milan Talkies film soundtrack, 2019
Raffy Shart, French-Armenian director and writer
Melissa Shart, a fictional character in the TV series The Last Man on Earth

See also
Joseph Sharts (1875-1965), American attorney, political activist, newspaper editor, and novelist